NW may refer to:

Arts and entertainment 
 NW (novel), by Zadie Smith
 Nat Wolff, a singer and actor
 New wave music, a genre
 New Weekly, an Australian celebrity magazine
 Nintendo Wii, a video game console

Geography 
 Northwest (disambiguation), multiple articles
 NW postcode area, northwest London, UK
 Nidwalden, a canton of Switzerland
 North Rhine-Westphalia, the most populous state of Germany
 North West (South African province)

Technology 
 Nanowire, a nanostructure with a diameter on the order of a nanometer
 NetWare, in file and protocol names of the Novell NetWare family
 Nuclear warfare, the use of nuclear weapons in war
 An ISO-specified vacuum flange fitting (code NW)

Other uses 
 No worries, an expression
 Norfolk and Western Railroad, a U.S. class I railroad
 North Western Reporter, a US case law report series
 Northwest Airlines (former IATA airline code NW)